Seersucker or railroad stripe is a thin, puckered, usually cotton fabric, commonly but not necessarily striped or chequered, used to make clothing for hot weather. Seersucker is woven in such a way that some threads bunch together, giving the fabric a wrinkled or puckered appearance. This effect is often achieved during weaving by warp threads for the puckered bands being fed at a greater rate than the warp threads of the smooth stripes. (These are often of different colors but do not need not be.) The unevenness causes the fabric to be mostly held away from the skin rather than being plastered on it when wet with sweat, facilitating heat dissipation and air circulation. It also means that ironing is not necessary.

Common items made from seersucker include suits, shorts, shirts, dresses, and robes. In the United States, it is often made in white and blue stripes; however, it is produced in a wide variety of colors, usually with narrow plain and puckered stripes in different colors.

History
During the British colonial period, seersucker was a popular material in Britain's hot-weather colonies such as British India. When seersucker was introduced in the United States it was used for many garments. For suits, the material was considered a mainstay of the summer wardrobe of gentlemen, especially in the hot and humid South before air conditioning.

During the American Civil War, this cheap but durable material was used to make haversacks and even the famous baggy pants of Confederate Zouaves such as the Louisiana Tigers.
From the mid-Victorian era until the early 20th century, seersucker was also known as bed ticking due to its widespread use in mattresses, pillow cases and nightshirts during the hot summers in the Southern US and Britain's overseas colonies. 

The fabric was originally worn by the poor in the U.S. until preppy undergraduate students began wearing it in the 1920s in an air of reverse snobbery.

Seersucker's comfort and easy laundering made it the choice of Captain Anne A. Lentz, one of the first female officers selected to run the Marine Corps Women's Reserve during the Second World War, for the summer service uniforms of the first female United States Marines. From the 1940s onwards, nurses and US hospital volunteers also wore uniforms made from a type of red and white seersucker known as candy stripe.

Hickory stripe
In the days of the Old West, a type of heavyweight indigo or navy blue seersucker known as hickory stripe was used to make the overalls, work jackets and peaked caps of train engineers and railroad workers such as George "Stormy" Kromer and Casey Jones. It was later worn by butchers and employees of the gasoline companies, most notably Standard Oil. This cotton fabric was durable like denim, cheap to produce, and kept the wearer cooler in the hot cab of the steam locomotive. Even today, the uniforms of American Union Pacific train drivers include "railroad stripe" caps based on those from the steam age.

In fashion
About 1909, New Orleans clothier Joseph Haspel, Sr. started making men's suits out of seersucker fabric, which soon became regionally popular as more comfortable and practical than other types of suits for the hot and humid southern climate.

During the 1950s, cheap railroad stripe overalls were worn by many young boys until they were old enough to wear jeans. This coincided with the popularity of train sets, and films such as The Great Locomotive Chase.  At the same time, seersucker formal wear continued to be worn by many professional adults in the Southern and Southwestern US. College professors were known to favor full suits with red bow ties, although 1950s Ivy League and 21st century preppy students usually restricted themselves to a single seersucker garment such as a blazer paired with khaki chino trousers. Menswear brands famous for manufacturing seersucker at this time included Brooks Brothers, Macy's, Sears, and Joseph Haspel of New Orleans.

In the 1970s, seersucker trousers were popular among young urban African Americans seeking to connect to their rural American heritage. The fabric made a comeback among teenage girls in the 1990s, and again in the 2010s.

Beginning in 1996, the US Senate held a Seersucker Thursday in June, where the participants dress in traditionally Southern clothing, but the tradition was discontinued in June 2012. It had been revived by members of the US Senate in 2014.

2010 to present

From 2012 onwards, seersucker blazers and trousers made a comeback among American men due to a resurgence of interest in preppy clothing and the 1920s fashion showcased in the 2013 film version of The Great Gatsby. Although pale blue and dark blue stripes remained the most popular choice, alternative colors included green, red, black, grey, beige, yellow, orange, purple, pink, and brown. The traditional two-button blazer was updated with a slimmer cut and Edwardian-inspired lapel piping, and double-breasted jackets became available during the mid-2010s. Since 2010, "Seersucker Social" events have been held in major cities across the United States, where participants wear vintage clothes and ride vintage bicycles. Such events are the summer equivalent of a Tweed Run, which is traditionally held in the fall.

In the 2016 Olympics hosted by Brazil, the Australian Olympic team received green and white seersucker blazers and Toms Shoes rather than the traditional dark green with gold trim. At the same time, seersucker pants, skirts, espadrilles, blouses, and even bikinis were worn as casual attire by many fashion conscious young women in America.

Weaving process
Seersucker is made by slack-tension weave.  The threads are wound onto the two warp beams in groups of 10 to 16 for a narrow stripe. The stripes are always in the warp direction and on grain.  Today, seersucker is produced by a limited number of manufacturers.  It is a low-profit, high-cost item because of its slow weaving speed.

Gallery

See also
Rayadillo

References

External links

Woven fabrics
American clothing
Indian clothing
1920s fashion
1950s fashion
1970s fashion
1990s fashion
2010s fashion
Workwear
History of rail transportation in the United States